Lulu may refer to:

Companies
 LuLu, an early automobile manufacturer
 Lulu.com, an online e-books and print self-publishing platform, distributor, and retailer
 Lulu Hypermarket, a retail chain in Asia
 Lululemon Athletica or simply Lulu, a Canadian athletic apparel company

Places
 Lulu, Florida, United States, an unincorporated community
 Lulu City, Colorado, United States, a mining town abandoned in 1885, on the National Register of Historic Places
 Lulu, Missouri, an unincorporated community
 Lulu Bay, a bay on Navassa Island in the Caribbean
 Lulu Town, a town on Navassa Island in the Caribbean
 Lulu Island, an island which comprises most of Richmond, British Columbia, Canada
 Al Lulu Island, also known as Lulu Island, a man-made island off the coast of Abu Dhabi island
 Lulu Roundabout, in Manama, Bahrain

Theatre, film, opera
 The two plays by Frank Wedekind whose protagonist is named Lulu:
 Earth Spirit (play) (Erdgeist, 1895)
 Pandora's Box (play) (Die Büchse der Pandora, 1904)
 Works based on them include:
 Lulu (opera), a 1935 opera by Alban Berg
 Lulu (1962 film), an Austrian film by Rolf Thiele
 Lulu (1980 film), a film directed by Walerian Borowczyk
 Pandora's Box (1929 film) directed by Georg Wilhelm Pabst based on both Wedekind plays

And unrelated to the Wedekind story:
 Lulu (Kuhlau opera), an 1824 Danish opera by Friedrich Kuhlau based on same fairy tale as Mozart's Magic Flute
 Lulu (1914 film), an Italian silent film directed by Augusto Genina
 Lulu (1917 film), a 1917 German silent film
 Lulu (1918 film), a Hungarian silent film directed by Michael Curtiz
 Lulù (1953 film), an Italian film directed by Fernando Cerchio
 Lulu (1996 film), a Canadian film directed by Srinivas Krishna 
 Lulu (2002 film), a French film starring Jean-Pierre Kalfon
 Lulu (2005 film), a Dutch film featuring Georgina Verbaan
 Lulu (2006 film), a German TV film featuring Matthias Schweighöfer
 Lulu (2014 film), an Argentine film

Music

 Lulu (1973 album), by Scottish singer Lulu
 Lulu (1981 album), by Scottish singer Lulu
 Lulu Belle and Scotty, stage name of Myrtle Eleanor Cooper (1913–1999) (and Scott Greene Wiseman), a major country music act of the 1930s and 1940s
 Lulu (Trip Shakespeare album) (1991)
 Lulu (Lou Reed and Metallica album) (2011), based on the Wedekind plays
 LuLu and the TomCat, Canadian children's musical group
 Don't Bring Lulu, Dixieland jazz song (1925)

Fictional characters
 Lulu, a character in the Final Fantasy video game series
 Lulu Spencer, a character in the soap opera General Hospital
 Lulu Moppet, a character in the comic strip Little Lulu
 Lulu, a character in WarioWare Gold
 Lulu, a character played by Louise Brooks in the 1929 film Pandora's Box
 Lulu Teruno, alias of Tellu, one of the Death Busters from the Sailor Moon metaseries
 Lulu, a character in the television drama Gilmore Girls
 Lulu, a teddy bear in the Australian children's television series Bananas in Pyjamas
 Lulu, a Muppet monster in the children's television series Sesame Street
 Lulu, a character played by Ashley Argota in the Nickelodeon television series True Jackson, VP

People
Lulu is a given name or surname.

 Lu'lu', the Arabic given name
 Lulu (singer) (born 1948, as Marie MacDonald McLaughlin Lawrie), Scottish singer and actress
 Anolyn Lulu (born 1979), Vanuatuan table tennis player
 Elizabeth Michael, Tanzanian actress also known as Lulu
 Li Xiaolu or Lu Lu (born 1982), Chinese actress
 Lu Lu (badminton) (born 1990), Chinese badminton player
 Lulu Antariksa (born 1995), American actress
 Lulu Benstead (1891–1983), Australian opera singer
 Lulu Guinness (born 1960), British fashion accessory designer
 Lulu Haangala (born 1984), a Zambian television personality
 Lulu Huang Lu Zi Yin (born 1991), Taiwanese television personality, singer and actress
 Lulu James (born 1991/92), British electronic and soul singer
 Lulu Kennedy (born 1969), British fashion entrepreneur
 Lucinda Pullar (born 1998), Australian rules footballer and former soccer player often nicknamed Lulu
 Lulu Roman (born 1946), American comedian, singer, and author
 Lulu Santos, stage name of Luiz Maurício Pragana dos Santos (born 1953), Brazilian singer and guitarist
 Lulu Wang (novelist) (born 1960), Chinese-born writer living in the Netherlands
 Omar Lulu, Indian film director
 Paddy Roe, Australian writer known as Lulu
 Zhou Lulu (born 1988), Chinese female weightlifter and 2012 Olympic champion
 Lulu and Nana (born 2018),  pseudonyms for twin Chinese girls, who are allegedly the first humans produced from embryos that were genome edited

Other uses
 Lulu (app), a mobile app that lets women rate men
 Lulu (dog), guide dog of blind hiker Trevor Thomas
 Locally unwanted land use (LULU), a public-policy planning term
 LuLu International Shopping Mall in Kochi, Kerala, India
 Lulu Convention Centre, Thrissur, Kerala, India
 Mk 101 Lulu, a nuclear depth charge formerly used by the United States

See also
 Land use, land-use change, and forestry (LULUCF)
 Loulou (disambiguation)
 Lulu smoothing, a non-linear mathematical smoothing technique
 Lulu on the Bridge, a film by Paul Auster
 Lula (disambiguation)